Achyranthes aspera var. sicula is a plant variety in the family pigweed.

References 

Achyranthes
Flora of Malta